Massimo Capra (born 1960) is an Italian-born Canadian restauranteur, restaurant consultant, cookbook author, and celebrity chef. He is known for his appearances on the television shows CityTV's Cityline, Global's The Morning Show, and Food Network shows Restaurant Makeover, Chopped: Canada, Top Chef Canada, and Wall of Chefs. He based in Mississauga, Ontario; near Toronto.

Career 
Massimo Capra was born May 24, 1960 in Soresina, Lombardy, Italy. He was primarily raised in Cremona. While he was a teenager he left home from 1974 to 1977 to study cooking in Salsomaggiore. Capra began his culinary career in Venice, working in a trattoria. He served in the Italian Army.

In 1982, Capra moved to Toronto. He started out working at Archer’s, a family-owned restaurant; followed by work at Prego della Piazza, a celebrity destination.

In 2014, Capra started working on a new restaurant venue modeled after his successful Pearson Airport restaurant Boccone Pronto. Located inside Doha, Qatar's Hamad International Airport, the restaurant was dubbed Soprafino Restaurant. He also pursued several other ventures during this time.

He is currently the owner of Capra's Kitchen in Mississauga, Ontario, in partnership with Mohamad Fakih of Paramount Fine Foods.

Publications 

Capra had a monthly column in The Globe and Mail'''s "New Life" section. Several of his recipes have appeared in print, and was the food editor for Canadian Home Trend Magazine for several years.

His first full cookbook, One-Pot Italian (September 2007), was published by Allen & Unwin; followed by the award-winning cookbook Three Chefs: The Kitchen Men'' (2012).

Massimo Capra was the brand ambassador for Buitoni pizza, Samsung appliances, Silani cheese, and Kraft olive oil dressings. He currently raises awareness for Grana Padano, Prosciutto di Parma, and Prosciutto di San Daniele.

Restaurants

Active 

 Capra’s Kitchen (2016–present), 1834 Lakeshore Road W, Mississauga, Ontario
 Massimo’s Italian (2018–present), Sheraton on the Falls Hotel, Niagara Falls, Ontario
 Boccone Trattoria, formerly Boccone Pronto (2013–present), Toronto Pearson International Airport, Mississauga, Ontario

Closed 

 Soprafino (2014–2021), Hamad International Airport, Doha, Qatar
 Mistura Restaurant (October 1997–September 2019), co-founded with Paolo Paolini, 256 Davenport Road, Toronto, Ontario
 Sopra Upper Lounge (c. 2011–c. 2019), 256 Davenport Road, Toronto, Ontario

Personal life

He is married to Rosa Capra and has raised two sons with her, Andrew (born in 1988) and Daniel (born in 1990). In June 2018, three days before his 30th birthday, Capra's eldest son Andrew passed away in an undisclosed accident while living in Prague, Czech Republic.

Capra currently resides in the Lorne Park neighborhood in Mississauga, Ontario.

References

External links

Massimo Capra at the Chef and Restaurant Database

1960 births
Living people
Italian emigrants to Canada
People from the Province of Cremona
Canadian television chefs
Participants in Canadian reality television series
Canadian restaurateurs
Canadian male chefs
Italian television chefs